The UEFA Women's U-19 Championship 2013 Final Tournament was held in Wales between 19 and 31 August 2013. Players born after 1 January 1994 were eligible to participate in this competition.

It was the first time Wales played in the final tournament. The tournament also qualified four teams to the 2014 FIFA U-20 Women's World Cup, with England, Finland, France and Germany claiming Europe's four places by reaching the semi-finals.

Tournament structure
The regulations make up for the following tournament structure:

Venues

Parc y Scarlets, Llanelli (capacity 14,870)
Bridge Meadow Stadium, Haverfordwest (2,000)
Stebonheath Park, Llanelli (1,005)
Richmond Park, Carmarthen (1,000)

Qualifications
There were two separate rounds of qualifications held before the Final Tournament.

First qualifying round

In the first qualifying round 40 teams were drawn into 10 groups. The top two of each group and the best third-place finisher, counting only matches against the top two in the group, advanced. The draw for this round was made on 15 November 2011.

Second qualifying round

In the second round the 21 teams from the first qualifying round were joined by top seeds Germany, France and England. The 24 teams of this round were drawn into six groups of four teams. The group winners and the runners-up team with the best record against the sides first and third in their group advanced to the final tournament.

Match officials
UEFA named six referees and eight assistant referees to officiate matches at the final tournament. Additionally, two referees from the host nation were chosen as fourth officials.

Referees
  Olga Zadinová (Czech Republic)
  Eleni Lampadariou (Greece)
  Eszter Urbán (Hungary)
  Monika Mularczyk (Poland)
  Petra Chudá (Slovakia)
  Dilan Deniz Gökçek (Turkey)

Assistant referees
  Araksya Saribekyan (Armenia)
  Cindy Zeferino de Oliveira (Austria)
  Sanja Rodjak Karšić (Croatia)
  Giuliana Guarino (Italy)
  Yana Mazanova (Russia)
  Svetlana Bilić (Serbia)
  Rocío Puente Pino (Spain)
  Belinda Brem (Switzerland)

Fourth officials
  Paula Brady (Ireland)
  Lorraine Clark (Scotland)

Group stage
The 7 teams advancing from the second qualifying round were joined by host nation Wales. The eight teams were drawn into two groups of four with the top two teams of each group advancing to the semifinals. The draw for the final tournament took place at Parc y Scarlets in Llanelli on 7 May 2013.

All kick-off times are local (WEST)

Group A

Group B

Knockout round
All four teams qualify to the 2014 U20 World Cup.

Bracket

Semi-finals

Final

Goalscorers
6 goals
 Pauline Bremer

3 goals
 Bethany Mead
 Sandie Toletti

2 goals

 Nikoline Frandsen
 Nikita Parris
 Paige Williams
 Juliette Kemppi
 Kadidiatou Diani
 Clarisse Le Bihan
 Linda Dallmann
 Synne Jensen

1 goal

 Melissa Lawley
 Jessica Sigsworth
 Katie Zelem
 Adelina Engman
 Léa Declercq
 Aminata Diallo
 Claire Lavogez
 Johanna Tietge
 Amalie Eikeland
 Synne Skinnes Hansen
 Andrine Tomter
 Marija Banušić

References

External links
Official website

 
2013
UEFA Women's U-19 Championship
UEFA Women's U-19 Championship
2013 UEFA Women's U-19 Championship
2013 in women's association football
August 2013 sports events in Europe
2013 in youth association football